Muzaffarnagar is a city under Muzaffarnagar District in the Indian State of Uttar Pradesh. It is situated midway on the Delhi - Haridwar/Dehradun National Highway (NH 58) and is also well connected with the national railway network. It is known as the sugarbowl of Uttar Pradesh.

The city previously called Sarwat and is located in the middle of the highly fertile upper Ganga-Yamuna Doab region and is very near to New Delhi and Saharanpur, making it one of the most developed and prosperous cities of Uttar Pradesh. It comes under the Saharanpur division. This city is part of Delhi Mumbai Industrial Corridor (DMIC) and Amritsar Delhi Kolkata Industrial Corridor (ADKIC). It shares its border with the state of Uttarakhand and it is the principal commercial, industrial and educational hub of Western Uttar Pradesh. As of July 2021, Chandra Bhushan Singh, IAS is the District Magistrate of Muzaffarnagar.

History

The town was established in 1633 by the son of a Mughal Commander Sayyid Muzaffar Khan Barha during the reign of Shah Jahan. At the time Muzaffarnagar was part of the Barah country as it was intimately connected with the Barah Sayyids, who became de-facto rulers of the Mughal empire in the 1710s. The Indian Muslim inhabitants of Barha especially from near the town of Jansath were heavily recruited in the Mughal army and in the personal cavalry of the Sayyid Brothers.

In 1901, during the British Raj, it was a district in the Meerut Division in United Provinces of Agra and Oudh. In 1947, when the country got independence Indian flag was hoisted for the first time in the Muzaffarnagar City.

On October 18, 1976, during "The Emergency, Prime Minister Indira Gandhi's suspension of democracy in India, between 25 and 30 people protesting against compulsory sterilization were killed when Uttar Pradesh police fired into the crowd.

2013 Muzaffarnagar riots
The 2013 Muzaffarnagar riots between Hindus and Muslims resulted in 62 deaths.

According to a May 2015 report in India Today:
Some politicians have demanded that the city name be changed from Muzaffarnagar to Lakshminagar.

Geography

Muzaffarnagar is 272 meters above sea level in the Doab region of Indo-Gangetic Plain. It is 125 kilometres north east of the national capital, New Delhi, and 200 kilometres south east of Chandigarh, and near to Roorkee, Saharanpur, Meerut & Bijnor.

Climate

Muzaffarnagar has a monsoon influenced humid subtropical climate characterised by much hot summers and cooler winters. Summers last from early April to late June and are extremely hot. The monsoon arrives in late June and continues until the middle of September. Temperatures drop slightly, with plenty of cloud cover but with higher humidity. Temperatures rise again in October and the city then has a mild, dry winter season from late October to the middle of March. June is the warmest month of the year.

The temperature in June averages 30.2 °C. In January, the average temperature is 12.5 °C. It is the lowest average temperature of the whole year. The rainfall averages 929 mm. The driest month is November, with 8 mm of rain. Highest precipitation falls in July, with an average of 261.4 mm.

Demographics

 2011 census, Muzaffar Nagar municipality had a population of 392,451 and the urban agglomeration had a population of 494,792. The municipality had a sex ratio of 897 females per 1,000 males and 12.2% of the population were under six years old.  Effective literacy was 80.99%; male literacy was 85.82% and female literacy was 75.65%.

The city has 55.79% Hindus, 41.39% Muslims, 1.7% Jains, 0.67% Sikhs, 0.67% Buddhists and 0.17% Christians

Muzaffarnagar city is governed by Municipal Council which comes under the remit of the Muzaffarnagar Urban Agglomeration. The city's population is 392,451; the urban/metropolitan population is 494,792, of which 261,338 are males and 233,454 are females.

Language
The Khariboli dialect is the native tongue of the city which resembles the Haryanvi dialect of adjoining Haryana. The official languages of Hindi and English are also widely understood.

Economy

Sugar and jaggery production are important industries in the district. As a result of the farming activities around, the city is an important hub of jaggery trading business.

Muzaffarnagar is an industrial city with sugar, steel and paper being the major industries. District Muzaffarnagar has 8 sugar mills. More than 40% of the region's population is engaged in agriculture. According to Economic Research firm Indicus Analytics, Muzaffarnagar has the highest agricultural GDP in Uttar Pradesh, as well as UP's largest granary.

Healthcare 
Muzaffaranagar has both public and private healthcare system. The District hospital is the major government hospital in the city along with several general practitioners in the city. The city is also catered by a private medical college (Muzaffarnagar Medical College) on the outskirts of the city.

Transportation

Muzaffarnagar connected by road and railway networks. The Ghaziabad - Saharanpur line passes through the city. Indian Railways provides connections to New Delhi, Western Uttar Pradesh, Jammu & Kashmir, Punjab, South India, and other parts of the country. Dehradun Shatabdi Express and Dehradun Jan Shatabdi Express trains pass through and halt at the Muzaffarnagar station. 

The National Highway - 58 (NH-58) passes through Muzaffarnagar city. This highway provides connections towards Delhi on the southern direction and upper reaches of the Himalayas in the Uttarakhand state in the northern direction. The highway is the backbone of road transportation for the Muzaffarnagar city as well as the Garhwal region of Uttarakhand. Cities and areas of Hardwar, Rishikesh, Dehradun as well as Badrinath and Kedarnath are served by this highway.

City transportation mostly consists of tricycles and 3-wheeled vehicles, rickshaws. An international airport, Muzaffarnagar International Airport, was proposed in the city in order to reduce the traffic at the Indira Gandhi International Airport, however, the same was transferred to the Jewar Airport.

Environmental concerns
Muzaffarnagar lies approximately halfway on the road from Delhi to Uttarakhand Rishikesh (the NH-58). As a result, many roadside resorts and eateries have sprung up on the highway near the city. Especially, the town of Khatauli is famed for its canal side forest park named "Cheetal". Once visited for the sight of deer and rabbits and other wild animals, the Cheetal is now encroached by privately owned dhabas and resorts thus sidelining the animals.

Notable people

Kapil Dev Agarwal, politician, MLA from Muzaffarnagar City and state minister in Uttar Pradesh Government.
Gourav Baliyan, wrestler
Rajpal Singh Baliyan, political figure, MLA from Budhana Assembly Seat.
Sanjeev Balyan, politician, Member of parliament Muzaffarnagar Loksabha
Kartar Singh Bhadana, political figure
Kamna Chandra, Haryana film writer
Sumit Jain, entrepreneur, co-founder & CEO Opentalk.to | co-founder and ex-CEO of Commonfloor.com
Divya Kakran, wrestler
Swami Kalyandev (1876–2004), an ascetic in the fields of education and social reform, awarded the Padma Bhushan by the Indian government
Amir Alam Khan , former M.P. and Uttar Pradesh minister, chairman of Bharat groups of colleges 
Liaquat Ali Khan, first Prime Minister of Pakistan (once lived in Muzaffarnagar) 
Nawazish Alam Khan, former MLA from Bhudana Vidhansabha
Nishu Kumar, Indian professional football player, plays as full back at Kerala Blasters FC and India.
Harendra Singh Malik, former Rajya Sabha MP, prominent Jat leader from Western Uttar Pradesh.
Pankaj Kumar Malik, political figure, MLA from Charthawal Assembly Seat. 
Alam Muzaffarnagari, Indian Urdu writer
Vishnu Prabhakar, novelist, writer, journalist
Sultan Rahi, Pakistani actor 
Sumit Rathi, Indian football player, plays for ATK and Indian U-17 Football Team
Rajpal Singh Saini, political figure
Nawazuddin Siddiqui, Bollywood actor
Narain Singh,  Gurjar leader and deputy chief minister of UP
Brahma Singh, scientist and agriculturist; awarded the Padma Shri by the Indian government.
Shaukat Thanvi, Pakistani author who wrote Qazi G
Rakesh Tikait, Farmer leader
A. M. Turaz, Indian poet, lyricist, and script writer

References

External links

Muzaffarnagar Official website

 
Cities and towns in Muzaffarnagar district
Cities in Uttar Pradesh